Marshall's House is the second solo album by the British guitarist John Squire. It was released in 2004 on his own North Country Records label.

Each song is inspired by, and shares its title with, a painting by Edward Hopper.

Track listing
All tracks composed by John Squire
"Summertime" - 3:13
"Hotel Room" - 2:15
"Marshall's House" - 4:15
"Lighthouse and Buildings, Portland Head, Cape Elizabeth, Maine" - 2:02
"Cape Cod Morning" - 4:23
"People In the Sun" - 4:07
"Tables for Ladies" - 2:45
"Automat" - 3:08
"Yawl Riding a Swell" - 3:07
"Room In Brooklyn" - 2:40
"Gas" – 3:56

Personnel
John Squire - guitar, vocals
George Vjestica - guitar, backing vocals
Jonathan White - bass
John Ellis - keyboards
Luke Bullen - drums, percussion

References

External links
 Official site

John Squire albums
2004 albums